Scott Camporeale (born 11 August 1975) is a former Australian rules footballer who played with Carlton and Essendon in the Australian Football League, and coached the Adelaide Football Club in an interim capacity of caretaker senior coach following the death of senior coach Phil Walsh in 2015.

Playing career

Carlton
Originally from South Australian National Football League (SANFL) club Woodville-West Torrens Eagles, Camporeale was drafted by Carlton with draft pick number 15 in the 1994 AFL Draft. His speed was an important part of Carlton's 1995 premiership winning side.

In 2000, Camporeale won Carlton's best and fairest award, the Robert Reynolds Trophy, as well as gaining All-Australian selection.

At the end of the 2005 season, Camporeale left Carlton, following his desire for a three-year contract, when Carlton would only offer a two-year contract. Carlton tried to make it difficult for him to leave, so Camporeale nominated for the 2006 Pre-season Draft. Essendon drafted Camporeale with draft pick number four in the pre-season draft. Camporeale played a total of  233 games and kicked a total 200 goals for Carlton from 1995 until 2005.

Essendon
After Camporeale nominated for the 2006 Pre-season Draft. Essendon drafted Camporeale with draft pick number four in the pre-season draft. His playing career came to an end when he suffered a right knee injury in Round 21, 2007. It occurred when he changed direction to tackle an opponent resulting with his knee bending and twisting the wrong way. He had successful ACL surgery on the knee but at 32 he opted to retire from his playing career. He played 19 games for Essendon in two seasons from 2006 until 2007 and kicked a total of 5 goals.

Coaching career

Essendon Football Club
Camporeale was an assistant coach at Essendon from 2008 to 2010.

Adelaide Crows
In October 2010, he joined the Adelaide Crows as an assistant coach in the role of midfield coach replacing Todd Viney. Following the death of Adelaide Crows senior coach Phil Walsh, Camporeale was appointed caretaker senior coach of the Adelaide Crows to the end of the 2015 season. Despite coaching the Crows to seven wins from his eleven matches in charge, he chose not to apply for the role full-time, with Don Pyke instead named Adelaide Crows new senior coach. Camporeale, however remained with the Crows as assistant coach. 

In October 2019, following a review into the Crows' football department, Camporeale departed the club.

Statistics

Playing statistics

|-
|- style="background-color: #EAEAEA"
|style="text-align:center;background:#afe6ba;"|1995†
|style="text-align:center;"|
| 16 || 24 || 11 || 18 || 236 || 121 || 357 || 50 || 37 || 0.5 || 0.8 || 9.8 || 5.0 || 14.9 || 2.1 || 1.5 || 5
|-
! scope="row" style="text-align:center" | 1996
|style="text-align:center;"|
| 16 || 23 || 20 || 18 || 268 || 132 || 400 || 56 || 39 || 0.9 || 0.8 || 11.7 || 5.7 || 17.4 || 2.4 || 1.7 || 5
|- style="background-color: #EAEAEA"
! scope="row" style="text-align:center" | 1997
|style="text-align:center;"|
| 16 || 12 || 7 || 7 || 149 || 65 || 214 || 42 || 19 || 0.6 || 0.6 || 12.4 || 5.4 || 17.8 || 3.5 || 1.6 || 0
|-
! scope="row" style="text-align:center" | 1998
|style="text-align:center;"|
| 16 || 22 || 27 || 22 || 334 || 151 || 485 || 87 || 27 || 1.2 || 1.0 || 15.2 || 6.9 || 22.0 || 4.0 || 1.2 || 7
|- style="background-color: #EAEAEA"
! scope="row" style="text-align:center" | 1999
|style="text-align:center;"|
| 16 || 23 || 30 || 20 || 380 || 146 || 526 || 91 || 32 || 1.3 || 0.9 || 16.5 || 6.3 || 22.9 || 4.0 || 1.4 || 4
|-
! scope="row" style="text-align:center" | 2000
|style="text-align:center;"|
| 16 || 25 || 31 || 21 || 493 || 201 || 694 || 77 || 43 || 1.2 || 0.8 || 19.7 || 8.0 || 27.8 || 3.1 || 1.7 || 10
|- style="background-color: #EAEAEA"
! scope="row" style="text-align:center" | 2001
|style="text-align:center;"|
| 16 || 21 || 20 || 12 || 392 || 102 || 494 || 68 || 44 || 1.0 || 0.6 || 18.7 || 4.9 || 23.5 || 3.2 || 2.1 || 5
|-
! scope="row" style="text-align:center" | 2002
|style="text-align:center;"|
| 16 || 20 || 7 || 9 || 264 || 105 || 369 || 51 || 48 || 0.4 || 0.5 || 13.2 || 5.3 || 18.5 || 2.6 || 2.4 || 4
|- style="background-color: #EAEAEA"
! scope="row" style="text-align:center" | 2003
|style="text-align:center;"|
| 16 || 20 || 18 || 4 || 338 || 107 || 445 || 43 || 38 || 0.9 || 0.2 || 16.9 || 5.4 || 22.3 || 2.2 || 1.9 || 0
|-
! scope="row" style="text-align:center" | 2004
|style="text-align:center;"|
| 16 || 22 || 21 || 12 || 324 || 122 || 446 || 58 || 74 || 1.0 || 0.5 || 14.7 || 5.5 || 20.3 || 2.6 || 3.4 || 9
|- style="background-color: #EAEAEA"
! scope="row" style="text-align:center" | 2005
|style="text-align:center;"|
| 16 || 21 || 8 || 4 || 330 || 126 || 456 || 63 || 37 || 0.4 || 0.2 || 15.7 || 6.0 || 21.7 || 3.0 || 1.8 || 0
|-
! scope="row" style="text-align:center" | 2006
|style="text-align:center;"|
| 17 || 12 || 3 || 1 || 161 || 88 || 249 || 48 || 37 || 0.3 || 0.1 || 13.4 || 7.3 || 20.8 || 4.0 || 3.1 || 0
|- style="background-color: #EAEAEA"
! scope="row" style="text-align:center" | 2007
|style="text-align:center;"|
| 17 || 7 || 2 || 2 || 75 || 51 || 126 || 20 || 9 || 0.3 || 0.3 || 10.7 || 7.3 || 18.0 || 2.9 || 1.3 || 0
|- class="sortbottom"
! colspan=3| Career
! 252
! 205
! 150
! 3744
! 1517
! 5261
! 754
! 484
! 0.8
! 0.6
! 14.9
! 6.0
! 20.9
! 3.0
! 1.9
! 49
|}

Head coaching record

*  Interim Head Coach

Personal life
Camporeale is an old scholar of St Michael's College, Adelaide.

References

External links

Scott Camporeale's profile and statistics from AustralianFootball.com
Scott Camporeale's Blueseum page

Carlton Football Club players
Carlton Football Club Premiership players
1975 births
Living people
Essendon Football Club players
Adelaide Football Club coaches
All-Australians (AFL)
South Australian State of Origin players
Woodville-West Torrens Football Club players
John Nicholls Medal winners
Australian people of Italian descent
Australian rules footballers from South Australia
Australia international rules football team players
One-time VFL/AFL Premiership players